Abu Boqqal (also Romanized as Abū Boqqāl and Abū Baqqāl; also known as Abu Baghāl, Abū Bogāl, Abū Qāl, Qal‘eh-ye Abū Baqqāl, Qal‘eh-ye Abū Qāl, and Saiyid Sālih) is a village in Anaqcheh Rural District, in the Central District of Ahvaz County, Khuzestan Province, Iran. At the 2006 census, its population was 976, in 176 families.

References 

Populated places in Ahvaz County